SS Robert Coryndon was a British twin-screw passenger and cargo ferry on Lake Albert in central Africa.

She was built in England in 1929 and reassembled in kit form at Lake Albert in 1930. She ran aground in 1962 and lay derelict until she was broken up for scrap between 2009 and 2012.

Building
John I. Thornycroft & Company at Woolston, Hampshire built the ship for Kenya and Uganda Railways and Harbours in 1929–30. She was named after the South African Sir Robert Coryndon, who was Governor of Uganda 1918–22. 

She was a "knock-down" ship. She was assembled in 1929 at Woolston. All her parts were marked with numbers, she was disassembled into many hundreds of parts, and transported in kit form to Africa, where she was reassembled on the shore of Lake Albert in 1930. Part of the overland journey to Lake Albert was by lorry, which severely limited the maximum size and weight of her parts.

Robert Coryndon was part of a plan for a network of railway, river steamer and lake steamer services linking British interests in Egypt, East Africa and southern Africa. Sir Winston Churchill described her as "the best library afloat".

Fate
Robert Coryndon sank in 1962, around the time of Ugandan independence from Britain. She was not refloated.

In 1967 the East African Railways and Harbours Corporation (EAR&H) offered her wreck for sale, but she remained largely intact in 2009 (see photo).

By the beginning of 2012 her wreck had been taken away "in bits and pieces by cutting all the metal remains for scrap" and only her aft king posts were still visible above the water.

References

1929 ships
Ferries of Uganda
Shipwrecks of Africa
Shipwrecks in lakes
Ships built by John I. Thornycroft & Company